Şemdinli is a town located in the Şemdinli District of Hakkari Province in Turkey and had a population of 16,079 in 2022. 

The town is populated by Kurds of the Humaru and Zerzan tribes and moreover of mixed tribal and non-tribal origin.

Neighborhoods 
Şemdinli is divided into the five neighborhoods of Beşevler, Karşıyaka, Moda, Yayla and Yeni.

Kurdish-Turkish conflict

Conflict between the PKK and the Turkish state forces

A bomb exploded in Şemdinli town centre on November 1, 2005. It was officially attributed to the Kurdistan Workers' Party (PKK), an armed Kurdish militant group. On November 9 one man was killed in a grenade attack on a local bookshop. The suspects of this attack, however, were caught in the act by bystanders. They were said to be members of a Turkish Gendarmerie unit, JITEM. The resulting investigation developed into a major political issue in Turkey in the first half of 2006. After a lengthy legal process the three suspects were eventually sentenced to 39 years.

Investigations concerning the Şemdinli bombing trial were blocked by the military, and all the judges and prosecutor associated with the Şemdinli bookshop bombing case transferred from Van to other cities following a June 2007 decree.

Clashes in 2012 

On 23 July 2012, Turkish security forces began a major security offensive, backed by airpower, against the PKK around Şemdinli. Interior minister, İdris Naim Şahin, explained that the forces were attempting to block the PKK's escape routes into northern Iraq, and that as many as 115 PKK fighters had been killed.  Television news channel, Nergis Televizyonu (NTV), claimed that up to two thousand troops were involved in the operation.  On 5 August 2012, PKK forces fired on a military post in the village of Gecimli, triggering clashes that killed 22 fighters, soldiers and village guards, and injuring 15 others, including five civilians.  The military post was one of a number attacked in Hakkâri Province, although there were no reports of casualties in the other incidents.

Population 
Population history of the municipality from 2007 to 2022:

Climate
Şemdinli has a hot, dry-summer continental climate (Köppen: Dsa).

References

External links 
 Today's Zaman, 16 April 2013, European court orders Turkey to pay 1.4 million euros over Şemdinli raid

Populated places in Hakkâri Province
Kurdish settlements in Hakkâri Province